Stuart or Stewart Elliott may refer to:

 Stuart Elliott (footballer, born 1977), English footballer
 Stuart Elliott (footballer, born 1978), Northern Ireland international footballer
 Stuart Elliott (drummer) for Steve Harley & Cockney Rebel, The Alan Parsons Project, Kate Bush and session drummer

See also
 Stewart Elliott, Canadian-American jockey